Silvia Di Pietro (born  6 April 1993) is an Italian swimmer. She represented her country at the 2016 Summer Olympics.

Di Pietro is an athlete of the Centro Sportivo Carabinieri.

References

External links
 

1993 births
Living people
Italian female swimmers
Swimmers at the 2016 Summer Olympics
Olympic swimmers of Italy
Medalists at the FINA World Swimming Championships (25 m)
Mediterranean Games gold medalists for Italy
Mediterranean Games medalists in swimming
Swimmers at the 2013 Mediterranean Games
Universiade bronze medalists for Italy
Universiade medalists in swimming
Swimmers of Centro Sportivo Carabinieri
Medalists at the 2013 Summer Universiade
European Aquatics Championships medalists in swimming
20th-century Italian women
21st-century Italian women
Swimmers from Rome